The women's tournament in volleyball at the 2016 Summer Olympics was the 14th edition of the event at an Olympic Games, organised by the world's governing body, the FIVB, in conjunction with the IOC. It was held in Rio de Janeiro, Brazil from 6 to 20 August 2016.

China won their third gold by defeating Serbia in the final. The United States won bronze by winning against the Netherlands.

The medals for the competition were presented by Yu Zaiqing, People's Republic of China; Anita DeFrantz, United States of America; and Chang Ung, Democratic People's Republic of Korea; members of the International Olympic Committee, and the gifts were presented by Ary Graça, Cristóbal Marte Hoffiz and Aleksandar Boričić, President and Executive Vice-Presidents of the FIVB.

Competition schedule

Qualification

Pools composition
Teams were seeded following the Serpentine system according to their FIVB World Ranking as of October 2015. FIVB reserved the right to seed the hosts as head of Pool A regardless of the World Ranking. Rankings are shown in brackets except Hosts who ranked 3rd. The pools were confirmed on 23 May 2016.

Rosters

Venue

Format
The preliminary round was a competition between the twelve teams divided into two pools of six teams. This round, the teams competed in a single round-robin format. The four highest ranked teams in each group advanced to the knockout stage (quarter-finals). The sixth placed teams in each pool was ranked eleventh in this competition. The fifth placed teams in each pool was ranked ninth. The knockout stage followed the single-elimination format. The losers of the quarter-finals were eliminated and ranked fifth. The quarter-final winners played in the semi-finals. The winners of the semi-finals competed for gold medals and the losers played for bronze medals.

Pool standing procedure
In order to establish the ranking of teams after the group stage, the following criteria should be implemented:
 Number of matches won
 Match points
 Set ratio
 Setpoint ratio
 Results between tied teams (head-to-head record)

Match won 3–0 or 3–1: 3 match points for the winner, 0 match points for the loser
Match won 3–2: 2 match points for the winner, 1 match point for the loser

Referees
The following referees were selected for the tournament.

 Hernán Casamiquela
 Arturo Di Giacomo
 Rogerio Espicalsky
 Paulo Turci
 Liu Jiang
 Denny Cespedes
 Nasr Shaaban
 Heike Kraft
 Mohammad Shahmiri
 Fabrizio Pasquali
 Luis Macias
 Piotr Dudek
 Ibrahim Al-Naama
 Andrey Zenovich
 Vladimir Simonović
 Juraj Mokrý
 Kang Joo-hee
 Susana Rodríguez
 Taoufik Boudaya
 Patricia Rolf

Preliminary round
All times are Brasília Time (UTC−03:00).

Pool A

Pool B

Knockout stage
All times are Brasília Time (UTC−03:00).

The first ranked teams of both pools played against the fourth ranked teams of the other pool. The second ranked teams faced the second or third ranked teams of the other pool, determined by drawing of lots. The drawing of lots was held after the last match in the preliminary round.

Bracket

Quarter-finals

Semi-finals

Bronze medal match

Gold medal match

Statistics leaders
Only players whose teams advanced to the semifinals are ranked.

Best scorers

Best spikers

Best blockers

Best servers

Best diggers

Best setters

Best receivers

Source: FIVB.org

Final standing

Medalists

Awards

Most Valuable Player
 Zhu Ting
Best Setter
 Alisha Glass
Best Outside Spikers
 Zhu Ting
 Brankica Mihajlović

Best Middle Blockers
 Milena Rašić
 Foluke Akinradewo
Best Opposite Spiker
 Lonneke Slöetjes
Best Libero
 Lin Li

See also
Volleyball at the 2016 Summer Olympics – Men's tournament
 Leap (Movie)

References

External links
Official website

Volleyball at the 2016 Summer Olympics
2016 in women's volleyball
Women's volleyball in Brazil
2016 in Brazilian women's sport
Women's events at the 2016 Summer Olympics